This is a list of Dungeons & Dragons rulebooks for the Dungeons & Dragons (D&D) fantasy role-playing game, sorted by the edition of the game that they appeared in. This list does not include books designed for use as premade adventures.

In Dungeons & Dragons, rule books contain all the elements of playing the game. And they cover rules to the game, how to play, options for gameplay, stat blocks and lore of monsters, and tables the Dungeon Master or player would roll dice for to add more of a random effect to the game. Options for gameplay mostly involve player options, like race, class, archetype, and background. But other options could be player equipment like weapons, tools, armor, and miscellaneous items that can be useful.

Original Dungeons & Dragons

Basic Dungeons & Dragons

The Dungeons & Dragons Basic Set was the successor to original Dungeons & Dragons and was released while TSR, Inc. was working on the Advanced Dungeons & Dragons set. This set was the beginning of the split into two separate games, driven by disagreements on the direction the game should take. The Basic set retained the simplicity and flexibility of the original game while Gary Gygax took Advanced Dungeons & Dragons in a more structured and complicated direction.

Initially it was expected that players would start using Basic edition and then graduate to Advanced Dungeons & Dragons. However, in 1981 the Basic Set underwent a complete revision and not long after this the Expert Set was released for the first time. All references to a progression from the Basic Set to Advanced Dungeons & Dragons were removed from the games and supplements as TSR, Inc. made clear that the expected progression was from the Basic Set to the Expert Set.  From this point the D&D dichotomy became fixed and the Basic/Expert pair were considered a completely separate game from Advanced Dungeons & Dragons.

Core products

Campaign settings

Supplemental rules

Other products

Starter sets

Advanced Dungeons & Dragons
Advanced Dungeons & Dragons (AD&D) greatly expanded upon the rules and settings of the original D&D game when it was released in 1977.  As such, this edition saw the publication of numerous books to assist players. The naming of the core books in this edition became the standard for all later editions.

Around 1983, books such as MM, PHB, DMG and DDG, all previous hardcover releases except Fiend Folio, were upgraded with new cover art and unified in "orange spine" look. This included only minimal text change such as removal of rape references in DMG (books are now labeled "ages 10 and up"). MM2 and the rest of the series followed the same format. By the end of its first decade, Advanced Dungeons & Dragons line had expanded to a library of 14 hardcover rulebooks, including three books of monsters, and two books governing character skills in wilderness and underground settings.

Core rules

Supplemental rules

Monsters and NPC

Campaign settings

Advanced Dungeons & Dragons 2nd edition
In 1989, Advanced Dungeons & Dragons 2nd edition was published. Initially, the second edition would consolidate the game, with two essential hardcovers and a 3-ring monster document binder that Dungeon Masters can sort contents as they wish. Periodically, TSR published 3 lines of optional rulebooks (PHBR/DMGR/HR) and additional monster compendium to enhance game play.

However, by popular demand TSR released a hardcover monster book in 1993. Also by 1995, with power creep from optional classes and races becoming prominent, they were forced to abandon their original plan and revise the entire line. Core rules were rewritten, reorganized and accompanied with new logo, new art and black bordered cover style but had only a few meaningful rule changes. Optional rules were also revised and reorganized in hardcover books in the same look.

Core rules

Supplemental rules

Dungeon Master's Guide Rules Supplements series

Historical Reference series

Class and race options

Monsters and NPCs

Spells and items

Campaign settings

Other products

Starter sets

Dungeons & Dragons 3rd edition and v3.5
A major revision of the AD&D rules was released in 2000. As the Basic game had been discontinued some years earlier, and the more straightforward title was more marketable, the word "Advanced" was dropped and the new edition was called just Dungeons & Dragons, but was still officially referred to as 3rd edition (or 3E for short).

This edition was the first to be released by Wizards of the Coast after their acquisition of the company, as well as the first to allow third-party companies to make supplemental materials by use of the Open Game License. A series of Map Folios were also produced.

In July 2003, a revised version of the 3rd edition D&D rules (termed version 3.5) was released that incorporated numerous rule changes, as well as expanding the Dungeon Master's Guide and Monster Manual.

Core rules

Supplemental rules

Environment series

Guidebooks

Class and race options

Monsters and NPCs

Spells and items

Campaign settings

Other products

Starter sets

Dungeons & Dragons 4th edition
The books from the "main" product line of 4th Edition are split into Core Rules and Supplement books. Unlike third edition of Dungeons & Dragons, which had the core rulebooks released in monthly installments, the 4th editions of the Player's Handbook, Monster Manual, and Dungeon Master's Guide were all released in June 2008.

In addition, beginning in September 2010 the stand-alone Essentials product line was released, aiming at novice players.

Preview releases

Core rules

Supplemental rules

Class and race options

Monsters and NPCs

Campaign settings

Other products

Starter sets

Essentials products

Dungeons & Dragons 5th edition
Initially promoted in playtest materials as Dungeons & Dragons Next, the fifth edition of Dungeons & Dragons was released in a staggered fashion through the second half of 2014. Unlike previous editions, this edition of the game was developed partly via a public open playtest. An early build of the new edition debuted at the 2012 Dungeons & Dragons Experience event to about 500 fans. Public playtesting began on May 24, 2012, with the final playtest packet released on September 20, 2013.
D&D Next preview and edition-free releases

Core rules 

The 5th edition's Basic Rules, a free PDF containing complete rules for play and a subset of the player and DM content from the core rulebooks, was released on July 3, 2014. The basic rules have continued to be updated since then to incorporate errata for the corresponding portions of the Player's Handbook and combine the Player's Basic Rules and Dungeon Master's Basic Rules into a single document.

Public playtests have continued through the Unearthed Arcana series, which is published for free online in PDF format.

Supplemental rules

Campaign settings

Other products

Adventures

Boxed sets

Digital, PDF and print on demand (POD) releases

Notes

References

Lists of books
Lists about role-playing games